Casco Histórico de Barajas is an administrative neighborhood (barrio) of Madrid belonging to the district of Barajas. As of 1 February 2020, it has a population of 7,735.

References 

Wards of Madrid
Barajas (Madrid)